The 1987 NHRA Winternationals (commonly known as the Winternats) were a National Hot Rod Association (NHRA) drag racing event, held at Auto Club Raceway, Pomona, California on 1 February.

Top Fuel began a revival, from what looked like a death knell in 1984, with thirty-two entrants for a sixteen-car Funny Car field, including Kenny  Bernstein (in his controversial, and quick, new Budweiser-sponsored Bud King Buick LeSabre), Ed "The Ace" McCulloch, Tom Hoover, Tom "Mongoo$e" McEwen, John Force, and Raymond Beadle. Bernstein's switch to Buick meant Ford's Motorcraft sponsorship would go to the new Candies and Hughes Ford Thunderbird, driven by Mark Oswald.

Events 
Top Fuel began a revival, from what looked like a death knell in 1984, with thirty-two entrants for a sixteen-car Funny Car field, including Kenny Bernstein, Ed McCulloch, and Tom McEwen, and Don Prudhomme (who, surprisingly, failed to qualify).

High-mounted wings and cylinder heads milled from billet aluminum were the leading technical highlights.

Maximum qualifying e.t. was 5.60, the quickest yet for a Top Fuel field.

Results

Top Fuel Dragster 
Top Fuel hosted a field of 16, including low e.t. qualifier Hank Endres (driving for John Carey), "Big Daddy" Garlits (qualified #3), Shirley Muldowney (#7 qualifier), Larry Minor (qualified #11), Gene "Snowman" Snow (#2 qualifier), Amato (qualified #6), and Darrell Gwynn (qualified #8).

Round One 
Low e.t. qualifier Hank Endres (turning in a 5.32) eliminated Carey (his car owner, who qualified #9, with a 5.49).  #17 qualifier Tom Morgan (stepping in after #12 qualifier Ray Stutz failed to start) lost to #4-qualified Dan Pastorini. Muldowney qualified #7, but lost to Bill Mullins, who qualified #15. Frank Bradley, who qualified #10, lost to #2 qualifier Gene "Snowman" Snow. Minor, #11 qualifier, was eliminated by Garlits (qualified #3).Qualifying #16 (high e.t.), Ed Moore was defeated by #8 qualifier Darrell Gwynn. Denver Schutz, #14 qualifier, lost to Joe Amato, who qualified #6. Dick LaHaie, qualified #5 (driving for Larry Minor), turned in a 5.307 pass to defeat Jack Ostrander, who qualified #13.

Round Two 
Pastorini lost to Gwynn. Amato defeated Snow. Garlits eliminated Mullins. Endres was defeated by LaHaie.

Round Three 
Gwynn lost to Amato, and LaHaie was eliminated by Garlits (5.38 to 5.36 seconds)

Final round 
Garlits also had a better reaction time.

Top Fuel Funny Car 
Top Fuel Funny Car began a revival, from what looked like a death knell in 1984, with thirty-two entrants for a sixteen-car field, including Bernstein, McCulloch, Hoover, Force, and Don Prudhomme (who, surprisingly, failed to qualify).

Round One 
Oswald (qualifying #2, at 5.52 seconds and ) defeated #10 qualifier Hoover. Force (qualified #9) lost to low-e.t. qualifier Bernstein.

Raymond Beadle, qualified #4, was defeated by #12-qualified Graeme Cowin. Doc Halladay, qualified #8, was beaten by high-e.t. qualifier Tim Grose. #14 qualifier John Martin defeated #6 qualifier Billy Meyer. Steve Hodkinson qualified #15, and eliminated #7 qualifier Johnny West.. McEwen qualified #13, and went out in round one.

Round Two 
Grose fell to Cowin, Hodkinson to Pulde. Bernstein trailered McCulloch, and Martin eliminated Oswald.

Semi-final round 
Martin was eliminated by Cowin, Pulde by Bernstein.

Final round 
Cowin faced off against Bernstein, and lost.

Pro Stock 

Round One 
Glidden eliminated #9 qualifier Mark Pawuk. Morgan defeated #8 qualifier Joe Lepone. Gary Brown, #15 qualifier, lost to the #7-qualified Firebird of Tony Christian. Bruce Allen qualified #3, but lost to #11 qualifier Don Coonce's Firenza. Johnson qualified #2, and eliminated # qualifier Kenny Delco. Lee Dean qualified #4, only to lose to Darrell Alderman, who qualified #12. Reid Whisnant qualified #13 and lost to #5 qualifier Butch Leal.  Steve Schmidt, qualified #12, lost to Gordie Rivera, qualified #6.

Round Two 
Glidden lost in round two to a holeshot by Leal (with a 7.52 e.t. to Glidden's 7.45). Alderman was eliminated by Morgan, Christian by Coonce. Rivera lost to Johnson.

Semi-final
Morgan faced Johnson, and lost. Leal eliminated Coonce.

Final round 
Johnson took the win.

Top Alcohol 

The TA/D final pitted Denny Lucas against Bill Barney. The win was initially given to Barney, but after examining the videotape recorded by Diamond T Sports, it finally went to Lucas.

Chuck Phelps brought his Bad Moon Rising TA/FC to Pomona; playing Creedence Clearwater Revival in the pits and dressing his crew as werewolves may (or may not) have contributed to his taking the class win.

Super Gas 

Super Gas had fully 62 entrants. The class was won by Ed Sellnow, in a small-block Camaro.

Competition Eliminator 

The field was 49 cars. Frank Parks qualified #15 in a C/ED, owned by Todd Patterson; Parks was eliminated in Round Three. The class was won by a B/Econo Altered Opel, owned and driven by Patterson.

Stock 

The Stock final matched Norm Rollings (of Pomona, in a Corvette (his first national event) lost to Harry Axemaker, in a G/SA 1971 Firebird; it would be his first class win in eighteen years of trying.

Notes

Sources 
Baskerville, Gray. "Winter Heat:  Leave it to Leavers", in Hot Rod, May 1987, pp. 90–91.
Danh, Philippe. "Winter Heat:  Life on the Starting Line", in Hot Rod, May 1987, p. 92.
Ganahl, Pat. "Winter Heat: '87 NHRA Wnternationals", in Hot Rod, May 1987, pp. 88–89.

NHRA
NHRA Winternationals
NHRA